The first series of Ojamajo Doremi was originally aired on TV Asahi from February 7, 1999, to January 30, 2000, and ran 51 episodes. It replaced the time slot for Yume no Crayon Oukoku and a new episode aired weekly. The series focuses on a young girl named Doremi Harukaze, who becomes a witch apprentice (witchling in the 4Kids dub). She is joined by her friends Hazuki Fujiwara and Aiko Senoo to complete nine witch exams in order to accomplish their goal.

A direct sequel, Ojamajo Doremi #, was created near the end of the show's run and aired right after Ojamajo Doremi'''s conclusion. It ran from February 6, 2000 to January 28, 2001 with 49 episodes. The same year, during summer, a short 30 minute film titled Ojamajo Doremi # The Movie was released along with Digimon Hurricane Touchdown!! / Supreme Evolution!! The Golden Digimentals for the 2000 Summer Toei Anime Fair. The Digimon movie was split into two parts and Ojamajo Doremi # The Movie was released between the two parts.

After Ojamajo Doremi # ended in 2001, another direct sequel, titled Mōtto! Ojamajo Doremi aired from February 4, 2001 to January 27, 2002 with 50 episodes. In the summer, another short 30 minute film was released in theaters, titled Kaeru Seki no Himitsu. It was released between Digimon Tamers: Battle of Adventurers and Kinnikuman.

Following Mōtto! Ojamajo Doremi, the fourth and final series, Ojamajo Doremi Dokkān!, aired on TV Asahi from February 3, 2002, to January 26, 2003, and ran 51 episodes.Ojamajo Doremi took a brief hiatus to early 2004, when Toei Animation announced news of making Ojamajo Doremi Na-i-sho. It, a 13-episode sidestory to Mōtto! Ojamajo Doremi, was originally scheduled to be released as an OVA beginning September 24, 2004, but was made available on Sky PerfectTV!! PPV from June 26, 2004 to December 11, 2004.

In the United States, Ojamajo Doremi was aired on 4Kids TV under the name Magical DoReMi'' beginning with a preview episode on August 13, 2005, several scenes were edited or removed. The series was regularly aired beginning September 10, 2005; 26 episodes by March 11, 2006. The show was then in reruns until August 19, 2006. The show resumed its run on November 13, 2007, exclusively on the network's web site and released its finale episode on May 2, 2008. Episode 30 was never released or dubbed in English.

Episodes

Series 1: Ojamajo Doremi

Series 2: Ojamajo Doremi Sharp (Ojamajo Doremi #)

Series 3: Mo~tto! Ojamajo Doremi

Main episodes

Sidestory: Ojamajo Doremi Na-i-sho

Series 4: Ojamajo Doremi Dokkān!

Movies

References
 General

 
 
 
 
 
 
 

 Specific

Episodes
Ojamajo Doremi